Joshua James Emmett (born March 4, 1985) is an American professional mixed martial artist. Emmett currently competes in the featherweight division for the Ultimate Fighting Championship (UFC). A professional competitor since 2011, Emmett has also competed for King of the Cage. As of November 8, 2022, he is #5 in the UFC featherweight rankings.

Background
Emmett was born in Phoenix, Arizona, on March 4, 1985. He grew up in a dysfunctional family with a single mom and late brother, Nick. He studied psychology in college with the intention of going into law enforcement and earned his Bachelor of Liberal Arts degree at Menlo College. Emmett wrestled for 14 years; beginning at El Camino Fundamental High School and continuing through his college years. Emmett wrestled his first two seasons at the junior college level at Sacramento City College, before transferring to NAIA Menlo College. After his collegiate career was over, he joined Urijah Faber's Ultimate Fitness to continue his desire in competing in combat sports. Emmett is also an accomplished Brazilian jiu-jitsu grappler, he won a world championship in the blue belt no-gi division.

Mixed martial arts career

Early career

2011 
After compiling an amateur record of 2–0, Emmett started his professional MMA career on October 8, 2011, and made his debut in Capitol Fighting Championship as a Featherweight. He broke his hand in  the first round and continued with the fight and managed to earn his first win by unanimous decision.

Emmett had surgery on his broken hand and had a 10 month lay off from competing. He returned to training to prepare for his next fight and broke the same hand on his last sparring session prior to the fight event which forced him to take another long break before returning to the cage.

2013
After his first professional win, he made a move to compete in West Coast Fighting Championship (WFC) and made his debut on August 3, 2013, against Mike Ryan, winning via guillotine choke in the first round.

On November 16, 2013, Emmett faced Noah Schnable and defeated him in 45 seconds in round one with TKO (punches).

2014
Emmett's third opponent with West Coast Fighting Championship was Adin Duenas on February 15, 2014. He managed to secure a win via unanimous decision.

Two months after the fight with Duenas, Emmett faced Tramain Smith at West Coast Fighting Championship 9. He won the fight via TKO (punches) in round one.

On September 13, 2014, Emmett was up against Tony Rios and judges awarded a win with a unanimous decision in favor of Emmett.

Emmett faced Brandon Ricetti on November 15, 2014, at West Coast Fighting Championship 12 in a five-round fight for the lightweight title belt. In the fifth round, Emmett loaded with punches, pressing Recetti to fall forward when Emmett hit Ricetti with a knee and Ricetti was KO.  The fight was ruled a No Decision at first as Ricetti was grounded when he got kneed. However, the decision was overturned after a review of the incident and a win was awarded to Emmett via unanimous technical decision. Emmett was crowned WFC Lightweight Champion.

2015
After he secured the championship belt, Emmett didn't return to compete until almost one year later on October 3, 2015, at KOTC promotion, facing Rocky Johnson. Emmett showed off his submission skills and won the fight via arm-triangle choke.

2016
Emmett returned to fight in West Coast Fighting Championship promotion in Sacramento, California, US, on January 23, 2016, against Christos Giagos, a former UFC fighter. Emmett secured a win via TKO at 2:21 of round 3 and also won the ISCF - International Sport Combat Federation (ISCF) Pro California Lightweight Title.

Ultimate Fighting Championship
After garnering a 9–0 record as a professional, Emmett signed with the UFC.

2016
Emmett made his promotional debut as a short notice replacement on May 8, 2016, against Jon Tuck at UFC Fight Night 87, where he replaced an injured Nick Hein. Emmett suffered a compound fracture on his left right finger from catching Tuck's spinning back kick and the referee halted the fight briefly prior to restarting.  Emmett secured a win with split decision (29-28, 28-29, 29-28).

Emmett was expected to face Jeremy Kennedy on August 27, 2016, at UFC on Fox 21. However, Emmett was forced out of the event, due to an injury.

On December 17, 2016, Emmett faced Scott Holtzman at UFC on Fox 22. The three round fight was a back and forth battle and judges awarded the win to Emmett via unanimous decision.

2017
Emmett faced promotional newcomer Desmond Green on April 8, 2017, at UFC 210. Emmett was outpointed by Green's striking and lost the fight via split decision of 29-28, 28-29, and 30-27.

Emmett faced Felipe Arantes in a featherweight bout on October 21, 2017, at UFC Fight Night 118. He won the fight via unanimous decision. Emmett dedicated this win to his friend's son, who has heart condition, at the age of 11 and has gone through an experimental surgery.

Emmett faced Ricardo Lamas on December 16, 2017, at UFC on Fox: Lawler vs. dos Anjos. At the weigh ins, Emmett weighed in at 148.5 pounds, 2.5 pounds over the featherweight upper limit of 146 pounds and the bout proceeded at a catchweight. Emmett forfeited 30% of his purse to Lamas. Emmett won the fight via knockout in the first round.

2018
Emmett faced Jeremy Stephens at UFC on Fox 28, which took place on February 24, 2018, in Orlando, Florida. Despite hurting Stephens in the first round, he lost the fight by knockout in the second round, after being hurt with an illegal knee and blows to the back of the head. As a result, Emmett was sidelined for the remainder of 2018, after undergoing successful surgery to correct facial injuries sustained during the Stephens fight.

2019
Emmett faced Michael Johnson on March 30, 2019, at UFC on ESPN 2. He won the fight via knockout in the third round.

Emmett faced Mirsad Bektić on July 13, 2019, at UFC Fight Night 155. He won the fight via technical knockout in round one. This win earned him the Performance of the Night award.

2020
Emmett was expected to face Arnold Allen on January 25, 2020, at UFC Fight Night 166. However, Emmett pulled out the fight, citing an undisclosed injury, and he was replaced by Nik Lentz.

Emmett was expected to face Edson Barboza on May 2, 2020, at UFC Fight Night: Hermansson vs. Weidman. However, on April 9, Dana White, the president of UFC announced that this event was postponed to a future date.

With one fight left on his contract, Emmett signed a new four-fight contract with the UFC. As the first fight of new prevailing contract, Emmett faced Shane Burgos on June 20, 2020, at UFC on ESPN: Blaydes vs. Volkov. He won the bout via unanimous decision. This fight earned him the Fight of the Night award. Emmett was sidelined for the remainder of 2020 and most of 2021, recovering from a litany of injuries to his left leg sustained in the fight, including an ACL tear.

2021 
Emmett faced Dan Ige on December 11, 2021, at UFC 269. He won the fight by unanimous decision.

2022 
Emmett faced Calvin Kattar on June 18, 2022, in the main event at UFC on ESPN 37. He won the close bout via split decision. 14 of the 19 media members scored the fight in favor of Kattar.  The bout was awarded the Fight of the Night award.

2023 
Emmett faced Yair Rodríguez for the Interim UFC Featherweight Championship on February 12, 2023, at UFC 284. He lost the bout via a triangle choke submission in the second round.

Championships and awards
Ultimate Fighting Championship
Performance of the Night (One Time)  
Fight of the Night (Two Times) 
West Coast Fighting Championship
WCFC Lightweight Champion (One time)
ISCF Pro California Lightweight Champion (One time)

Personal life
Emmett is married to his wife Vanessa.

Mixed martial arts record

|-
|Loss
|align=center|18–3
|Yair Rodríguez
|Submission (triangle choke)
|UFC 284
|
|align=center|2
|align=center|4:19
|Perth, Australia 
|
|-
|Win
|align=center|18–2
|Calvin Kattar
|Decision (split)
|UFC on ESPN: Kattar vs. Emmett
|
|align=center|5
|align=center|5:00
|Austin, Texas, United States
| 
|-
|Win
|align=center|17–2
|Dan Ige
|Decision (unanimous)
|UFC 269
|
|align=center|3
|align=center|5:00
|Las Vegas, Nevada, United States
|
|-
|Win
|align=center|16–2
|Shane Burgos
|Decision (unanimous)
|UFC on ESPN: Blaydes vs. Volkov
|
|align=center|3
|align=center|5:00
|Las Vegas, Nevada, United States
|
|-
|Win
|align=center|15–2
|Mirsad Bektić
|TKO (punches)
|UFC Fight Night: de Randamie vs. Ladd
|
|align=center|1
|align=center|4:25
|Sacramento, California, United States
|
|-
|Win
|align=center|14–2
|Michael Johnson
|KO (punch)
|UFC on ESPN: Barboza vs. Gaethje
|
|align=center|3
|align=center|4:14
|Philadelphia, Pennsylvania, United States
|
|-
|Loss
|align=center|13–2
|Jeremy Stephens
|KO (elbows)
|UFC on Fox: Emmett vs. Stephens
|
|align=center|2
|align=center|1:35
|Orlando, Florida, United States
|
|- 
|Win
|align=center|13–1
|Ricardo Lamas
|KO (punch)
|UFC on Fox: Lawler vs. dos Anjos
|
|align=center|1
|align=center|4:33
|Winnipeg, Manitoba, Canada
|
|-
|Win
|align=center|12–1
|Felipe Arantes
|Decision (unanimous)
|UFC Fight Night: Cowboy vs. Till
|
|align=center|3
|align=center|5:00
|Gdańsk, Poland
|
|-
|Loss
|align=center|11–1
|Desmond Green
|Decision (split)
|UFC 210
|
|align=center|3
|align=center|5:00
|Buffalo, New York, United States    
|
|-
|Win
|align=center|11–0
|Scott Holtzman
|Decision (unanimous)
|UFC on Fox: VanZant vs. Waterson
|
|align=center|3
|align=center|5:00
|Sacramento, California, United States
|
|-
|Win
|align=center|10–0
|Jon Tuck
|Decision (split)
|UFC Fight Night: Overeem vs. Arlovski
|
|align=center|3
|align=center|5:00
|Rotterdam, Netherlands   
|
|-
|Win
|align=center|9–0
|Christos Giagos
|TKO (punches)
|West Coast FC 16
|
|align=center|3
|align=center|2:21
|Sacramento, California, United States
| 
|-
|Win
|align=center|8–0
|Rocky Johnson
|Submission (arm-triangle choke)
|KOTC: Total Elimination
|
|align=center|1
|align=center|2:45
|Oroville, California, United States
|
|-
|Win
|align=center|7–0
|Brandon Ricetti
|Technical Decision (unanimous)
|West Coast FC 12
|
|align=center|5
|align=center|0:24
|Sacramento, California, United States
|
|-
|Win
|align=center|6–0
|Tony Rios
|Decision (unanimous)
|West Coast FC 11
|
|align=center|3
|align=center|5:00
|Sacramento, California, United States
|
|-
|Win
|align=center|5–0
|Tramain Smith
|TKO (punches)
|West Coast FC 9
|
|align=center|1
|align=center|2:28
|Sacramento, California, United States
|
|-
|Win
|align=center|4–0
|Adin Duenas
|Decision (unanimous)
|West Coast FC 8
|
|align=center|3
|align=center|5:00
|Sacramento, California, United States
|
|-
|Win
|align=center|3–0
|Noah Schnable
|TKO (punches)
|West Coast FC 7
|
|align=center|1
|align=center|0:45
|Jackson, California, United States
|
|-
|Win
|align=center|2–0
|Mike Ryan
|Submission (guillotine choke)
|West Coast FC 6
|
|align=center|1
|align=center|1:52
|Placerville, California, United States
|
|-
|Win
|align=center|1–0
|Emilio Gonzales
|Decision (unanimous)
|Capitol Fighting Championships: Fall Classic
|
|align=center|3
|align=center|5:00
|Sacramento, California, United States
|

See also 
 List of current UFC fighters
 List of male mixed martial artists

References

External links 
 
 

Living people
1985 births
People from South San Francisco, California
Lightweight mixed martial artists
Mixed martial artists utilizing collegiate wrestling
Mixed martial artists utilizing Brazilian jiu-jitsu
American male mixed martial artists
Mixed martial artists from California
Sportspeople from Sacramento, California
Ultimate Fighting Championship male fighters
American male sport wrestlers
Amateur wrestlers
American practitioners of Brazilian jiu-jitsu